The 1922 CCNY Lavender football team was an American football team that represented the City College of New York (CCNY) as an independent during the 1922 college football season. In their first season since 1907, the team compiled a 1–6 record.

Schedule

References

CCNY
CCNY Beavers football seasons
CCNY Lavender football